The SPIKES protocol is a method used in clinical medicine to break bad news to patients and families. As receiving bad news can cause distress and anxiety, clinicians need to deliver the news carefully. By using the SPIKES method for introducing and communicating information to patients and their families, it can aid in the presentation of the material.  The SPIKES method is helpful in providing an organized manner of communication during situations that are typically complex and difficult to communicate.  According to research related to the SPIKES method, important factors to consider when using this protocol involve empathy, acknowledgement and validation of feelings, providing information about intervention and treatment, and ensuring that the patient understands the news being delivered.

The protocol was first proposed in 2000 by Baile et al, in the context of oncology.

The name SPIKES is an acronym, where the letters stand for:
 S: setting, i.e. setting up the consultation appropriately: 
→ This entails never to give bad news by use of phone or in a hallway. One may consider to sit in a private space or room with no distractions so to be sure the message being delivered is the one focused on; no use of televisions or cellphones. Ensure that you face both the patient and the family and establish therapeutic alliance or connection by use of eye contact and physical touch, i.e. holding a hand or touching an arm.
 P: perception, i.e. assessing the patient's perception of the situation
→ Begin by asking the patient what they believe is going on. This not only allows you to find out what they know about the situation, but also engages the patient. It allows for them to realize what they think matters, and forms a starting point for how to proceed. It is important to listen to what the patient tells you as this is the first place to correct any misconceptions that are held right away.
 I: invitation, i.e. prompting the patient to invite the clinician to deliver the news
→ Using phrases such as "Shall I share the results of the scan with you now?" or "Is this a good time to share with you what I believe is going on?" allow for the patient to decide if they are ready to hear more and also allows for open discussion to follow. Phrasing is important as you are essentially asking for permission to share unpleasant news with them. The way it is worded shows respect for the patient's feelings and reflects on their readiness to receive news. 
 K: knowledge, i.e. providing the knowledge to the patient
→ Speak slowly, maintain eye contact, and use terms both parties can understand. This is the time to explain what the bad news means for the patient. Beware of adding extra details right away as this is the place to be clear and concise of what is happening.
 E: empathy, i.e. empathizing with the impact of the news on the patient
→ Often it is hard to fully understand what is going through the patient's or families' minds. Silence is often best instead of speaking out as everyone is processing emotions. When you feel it is the right time to speak, speak out of empathy and acknowledge that your patient is feeling something. Do not discourage tears or silence, this may be a processing strategy that is necessary to fully come to terms with the situation. Provide support.
 S: strategy, i.e. devising a strategy for what to do next
→ Summarize all thoughts and decide where to go from here. Options to discuss may be treatment, setting another meeting, discussing hospice care, or many others. Each situation is unique and it is best to do what is in the best interest of the patient's needs and wants.

References

Medical terminology
Health care quality